Calder is a small hamlet in Cumbria, England.

It is overlooked by the Sellafield nuclear plant—Calder Hall Nuclear Power Station was the world's first major nuclear power station when it opened in 1956.

References

Hamlets in Cumbria
Borough of Copeland